"Scare Easy" is a song written and sung by Tom Petty. It featured on the debut album by rock band  Mudcrutch featuring Petty and Mike Campbell. The song was used in a 2008 commercial for My Name Is Earl. The song peaked at #4 on the Billboard chart.

"Scare Easy" was described as being "full of the tones and lyrics of the mid 1970s. but the tight harmonies come from musicians who have matured."

The song can also be heard over the end credits of the movie Appaloosa (2008), a western directed and starring Ed Harris and co-starring Viggo Mortensen and Renée Zellweger. However, "Scare Easy" does not appear on Jeff Beal's official soundtrack for the movie.

Personnel
Mike Campbell – Guitar, Mandolin
Tom Leadon – Guitar, Vocals
Randall Marsh – Drums
Tom Petty – Bass, Vocals
Benmont Tench – Keyboards, Vocals

References

External links
 - From the official Mudcrutch YouTube Channel
official website

2008 songs
Mudcrutch songs
Songs written by Tom Petty